Auburn Historic District may refer to:

in the United States
(by state)
Auburn University Historic District, Auburn, AL, listed on the NRHP in Alabama
Old Auburn Historic District, Auburn, CA, listed on the NRHP in California
Auburn Mills Historic District, Yorklyn, DE, listed on the NRHP in Delaware
Sweet Auburn Historic District, Atlanta, GA, listed on the NRHP in Georgia
Auburn Historic District (Auburn, Georgia), listed on the NRHP in Georgia
Downtown Auburn Historic District, Auburn, IN, listed on the NRHP in Indiana
Auburn Historic District (Auburn, Kentucky), listed on the NRHP in Kentucky
Auburn Commercial Historic District, Auburn, Maine
Auburn-Harpswell Association Historic District, South Harpswell, ME, listed on the NRHP in Maine
Auburn Historic District (Auburn, Nebraska)
Mount Auburn Historic District, Cincinnati, OH, listed on the NRHP in Ohio

See also
Auburn (disambiguation)